One Lord, One Faith, One Baptism is a 1987 gospel album recorded by Aretha Franklin, for Arista Records. Recorded at New Bethel Baptist Church in Detroit, Michigan, over the course of three nights (July 27, 28, and 30, 1987), One Lord, One Faith, One Baptism became an album that combined the gospel talents of Aretha, her sisters Erma and Carolyn, and fellow gospel singer Mavis Staples.

However, this release had modest sales, peaking at #106 on Billboard's album chart, and paled in comparison to Aretha's legendary classic Amazing Grace recording.

The original release was a double vinyl LP issued by Arista Records in December, 1987. An abridged single CD was also issued removing two tracks (the speech by Rev. Jesse Jackson that opens Side 3 of the vinyl edition, and the Prayer Invocation by Rev. Donald Parsons that appeared on Side 4 of the vinyl edition). In 2003, the double vinyl version was reissued as a 2-CD set by ARISTA BMG Heritage - this version was remastered and expanded by adding 4 previously unissued bonus tracks to the end of the second disc. The edited structure of the original double vinyl edition is retained to preserve the original album experience.

Track listing
Vocalists on tracks are identified by superscripts: (a) Aretha Franklin, (b) Mavis Staples, (c) Reverend Cecil Franklin, (d) Reverend Jesse Jackson, (e) Reverend Jaspar Williams, (f) Erma Franklin, (g) Carolyn Franklin, (h) Joe Ligon of The Mighty Clouds of Joy

Original Vinyl Double Album (1987)

Side one
"Walk In The Light (Traditional) - 4:00 a
"Prayer Invocation by Rev. Cecil Franklin - 5:44 c
"Introduction of Aretha and the Franklin Sisters by Rev. Jesse Jackson - :37 a d f g
"Jesus Hears Every Prayer (Clara Ward) - 5:16 a d f g
"Surely God Is Able (Clara Ward) - 6:01 a d f g

Side two
"The Lord's Prayer (Traditional) - 5:05 a
"Introduction of Aretha and Mavis Staples by Rev. Jesse Jackson - 3:22 a b d
"Oh Happy Day (Edwin Hawkins) - 6:09  a b
"We Need Power (Traditional) - 6:30 a b

Side three
"Speech by Rev. Jesse Jackson [July 27th] - 9:57 d
"Ave Maria (Traditional) - 6:48 a
"Introduction To Higher Ground by Rev. Jaspar Williams - 4:10 e
"Higher Ground" (Traditional) - 1:07 a e

Side four
"Higher Ground (continued) - 2:04 a e
"Prayer Invocation by Rev. Donald Parsons [July 28] - 7:29
"I've Been In The Storm Too Long (Traditional) - 7:55 a h
"Packing Up, Getting Ready To Go (Clara Ward) - 5:34 a b f g h

Remastered Expanded Double CD (2003)
Disc one
 "Walk In The Light (Traditional) - 4:00 a
 "Prayer Invocation by Rev. Cecil Franklin - 5:49 c
 "Introduction of Aretha and the Franklin Sisters by Rev. Jesse Jackson - 0:48 a d f g
 "Jesus Hears Every Prayer (Clara Ward) - 7:20 a d f g
 "Surely God Is Able (Clara Ward) - 4:44 a d f g
 "The Lord's Prayer (Traditional) - 5:06 a
 "Introduction of Aretha and Mavis Staples by Rev. Jesse Jackson - 3:22 a b d
 "Oh Happy Day (Edwin Hawkins) - 6:10  a b
 "We Need Power (Traditional) - 6:32 a b
 "Speech by Rev. Jesse Jackson [July 27th] - 9:58 d

Disc two
 "Ave Maria (Traditional) - 6:51 a
 "Introduction To Higher Ground by Rev. Jaspar Williams - 4:09 e
 "Higher Ground (Traditional) - 3:56 a e
 "Prayer Invocation by Rev. Donald Parsons [July 28] - 7:31
 "I've Been In The Storm Too Long (Traditional) - 8:10 a h
 "Packing Up, Getting Ready To Go (Clara Ward) - 5:35 a b f g h
 "Be Grateful (Walter Hawkins) [Bonus Track - Previously Unreleased] - 9:22 a b
 "Beams Of Heaven (Some Day) (Charles A. Tindley) [Bonus Track - Previously Unreleased] - 7:21 a 
 "Father, I Stretch My Hands To Thee (Charles Wesley, CM Hugh Wilson) [Bonus Track - Previously Unreleased] - 7:04 a b
 "Packing Up, Getting Ready To Go [Bonus Track - Previously Unreleased Alternate Version] (Clara Ward) - 5:17 a b f g h

Personnel 

Aretha Franklin - Vocals, piano
Mavis Staples - Vocals
Brenda Corbett - Vocals
Brian Leskowicz - Engineer
Carolyn Franklin - Vocals
Dana Davis - Percussion
David Hewitt - Engineer
Earl Wright Jr. - Organ
Erma Franklin - Vocals
Frank Fischer - House Mix
Fritz Lange - Engineer
Joe Ligon - Arranger
Reverend Jesse Jackson - Speaker
Reverend Cecil Franklin - Speaker

John Hudson - Product Manager
Lanar Brantley - Bass
Margaret Branch - Background Vocals
Mark Wilder - Mastering
Maude Gilman - Design
Michael Iacopelli - Mixing
Michael Wright - Guitar
Nedra Olds-Neal - Reissue Producer
Nick Johnson - Piano
Ortheia Barnes - Background Vocals
Phil Gitomer - Engineer
Renee Thomas - Background Vocals
Sandra Feva - Background Vocals
Thomas Whitfield - Organ, Piano, Arranger, Vocal Arrangement

Chart history

References

Aretha Franklin live albums
1987 live albums
Arista Records live albums
1987 in Michigan